D. Pedro Mascarenhas, 1st Count of Sandomil (9 November 1670 – 3 August 1745), was a Portuguese nobleman and colonial administrator, Viceroy of India from 1732 to 1741.

Early life 
Pedro was born on 9 November 1670 to D. Fernão Mascarenhas and D. Antónia de Bourbon. He was commander of the Order of Christ and of the Order of Santiago.

He fought at the War of the Spanish Sucession at the rank of Mestre de campo general.

Pedro was married with D. Margarida Juliana de Távora, widow of Francisco Barreto de Meneses, and daughter of the 2nd Count of São Miguel, D. Álvaro José Botelho de Távora. He was made Count of Sandomil by royal charter of 12 March 1720.

Viceroy of India 
The Count of Sandomil was nominated Viceroy of India on 12 March 1732, sailing from Lisbon to Goa on 26 April, and he was sworn on 7 November.

His government was effectively disastrous, because in 1739 he lost the Província do Norte (Northern Province), and in 1740 a Portuguese squadron was destroyed and captured by the Marathas.

On 18 May 1741 he handed over the government to the Marquis of Louriçal and on 6 January 1742 he returned to Portugal, arriving in Lisbon in November of the same year.

Later life 
The Count of Sandomil died in Lisbon on 3 August 1745.

References 

Viceroys of Portuguese India
Commanders of the Order of Christ (Portugal)